Nigel Howard Williams is the current dean of St Asaph.

Williams was born in St Asaph in 1963, and educated at Llysfasi College, the University of Wales Cardiff and St Michael's College, Llandaff. After working as depot manager at a farming supplies company he was ordained in 1996. He was priest in charge of Llanrwst then vicar of Colwyn Bay. He was also area dean of Rhos from 2004 to 2009. He was installed as Dean of St Asaph on 17 September 2011.

References

1963 births
Alumni of Coleg Cambria
Alumni of Cardiff University
Alumni of St Michael's College, Llandaff
Deans of St Asaph
Living people